Sidalcea robusta is an uncommon species of flowering plant in the mallow family known by the common name Butte County checkerbloom.

Description
This rhizomatous perennial herb produces a sturdy stem which can exceed a meter in height. Sidalcea robusta is mostly hairless above with sparse hairs near the base. The leaves are divided into pointed lobes and have bristly hairs on their upper surfaces. The inflorescence is a long, open series of flowers which can be  in length.

Distribution
Sidalcea robusta is endemic to Butte County, California, where it is known from about 20 occurrences, including some near Chico. It is a resident of chaparral and woodland habitat in mountain foothills.

It is an Endangered species listed by the California Native Plant Society Inventory of Rare and Endangered Plants and The Nature Conservancy.

References

External links
Calflora Database: Sidalcea robusta  (Butte County checkerbloom)
Jepson Manual eFlora (TJM2) treatment of Sidalcea robusta
USDA Plants Profile for Sidalcea robusta (Butte County checkerbloom)
UC CalPhotos gallery: Sidalcea robusta

robusta
Endemic flora of California
Natural history of the California chaparral and woodlands
Natural history of Butte County, California
Chico, California